The Miss Zimbabwe is a national Beauty pageant in Zimbabwe.

History
The Miss Zimbabwe was founded in 1980 when the national beauty pageant was transformed from Miss Rhodesia after attaining independence.

Sash titles
In 2011, the Miss Tourism Zimbabwe were crowned as Miss World Zimbabwe, Miss Tourism Zimbabwe and Miss Universe Zimbabwe. Specially for Miss Universe Zimbabwe did not allow to compete at Miss Universe by Miss Universe Organization. As the result of 2011, for the first time, Miss Universe Zimbabwe title was competed at Miss International 2011 in Chengdu, China and she was awarded as the most expressive award.

Resignations
In 2014, according to chairperson Marry Chiwenga, said the reasons for the 22-year-old university law student's resignation were “a prerequisite to both the Miss Zimbabwe and the Miss World pageants”. Thabiso is understood to have volunteered the information which necessitated her stepping down to the Trust. Thabiso is likely to be replaced by first princess Tendai Hunda.

Miss Universe's Franchise holders
Miss Parade, Modusa Promotion by Angeline Chinyoka (Agency Unveils 'Beauty And Brains' Modelling Contest) (1998―2000)
Yvette D'Almeida-Chakras (2001)

Miss Supranational's Franchise holders
The Zimbabwean Queen Organization, Farai Zembeni (2022―present)

Titleholders
Here those were using the name of Miss Zimbabwe titleholders. Later after 2017 the organization moved to Miss World Zimbabwe organization.

Titleholders under Miss Zimbabwe org.

Miss Universe Zimbabwe

Since its inception in 1997, the Miss Parade beauty pageant has improved in quality and grown in stature; qualifying it as one of Zimbabwe's top annual catwalk highlights, alongside Miss Zimbabwe, Supermodel and Miss Universe. The pageant has become one of the most glamorous, judging by the successes of some of its most recent winners and has launched a number of Zimbabwean girls into successful modelling and other related careers. The last edition of Miss Universe Zimbabwe was Tsungai Muswerakuenda, expired on 31 March 2002 which means the title has no current holder. The Miss Universe Zimbabwe was officially directed by Yvette D'Almeida Chakras (Miss Zimbabwe Universe 1994). Since 2002 Zimbabwe does not compete at Miss Universe due to various political and social problems that it is facing at this very moment.Zimbabwe: No Miss Universe

Miss International Zimbabwe

Miss Supranational Zimbabwe

Miss World Zimbabwe

Started in 2017 the Miss World Zimbabwe revealed the new name as "Miss World Zimbabwe" competition. The main winner expected to represent her country at Miss World pageant. This pageant chaired by Marry Mubaiwa Chiwenga.

References

External links
Official page
Miss Supranational Zimbabwe Official Instagram Page
Miss Supranational Zimbabwe Official Website

Miss Universe by country 
Beauty pageants in Zimbabwe
Recurring events established in 1980
1980 establishments in Zimbabwe